The 1964–65 season was Real Madrid Club de Fútbol's 62nd season in existence and the club's 33rd consecutive season in the top flight of Spanish football.

Summary
The club clinched its 11th League title
four points above runners-up Atlético Madrid and five championship in a row a record remained until 1990 when the club won again the same consecutive trophies. Defensive line was crucial for the title allowing only 18 goals against, instead of an attacking style played by the team in last seasons. New Spanish arrivals for the squad were taking form into the club: from UD Las Palmas goalkeeper Antonio Betancort, from Granada CF 19-yrs-old midfielder Pirri (playing his match debut in the campaign against FC Barcelona replacing suspended Puskas), forwards Grosso, Serena (replacing ageing Puskas) and youngstar defender Manuel Sanchis.

In Copa del Generalísimo, the club was eliminated by Atlético Madrid in the round of 16 after a 0–4 away defeat. Meanwhile, in the European Cup the squad was reached the quarter-finals where it defeated by Portuguese side Benfica 3–6 on aggregate (including a 1–5 loss in Lisbon).

Squad

Transfers

Competitions

La Liga

League table

Position by round

Matches

Copa del Generalísimo

Round of 32

Eightfinals

European Cup

Preliminary round

Eightfinals

Quarter-finals

Statistics

Players statistics

References

External links
 BDFútbol

Real Madrid CF seasons
Spanish football championship-winning seasons
Real Madrid